Haasiasaurus is an extinct genus of  early mosasaur, originally named "Haasia" by M. J. Polcyn et al., in honour of the palaeontologist Georg Haas. (The original name was a junior homonym of Haasia Bollman, 1893, a genus of millipedes.)

References

Mosasaurids
Extinct animals of Asia
Mosasaurs of Asia
Fossil taxa described in 2003